Chathikkatha Chanthu is a 2004 Indian Malayalam-language comedy-drama film written and directed by Rafi Mecartin and produced by Lal under the banner of Lal Creations. It stars Jayasurya in the title role, along with Vineeth, Lal, Navya Nair and Bhavana in other major roles. The film features original songs composed by Alex Paul, while Berny-Ignatius did the scoring. The plot follows Chanthu, an aspiring scriptwriter. The film was released on 14 April 2004 and has a cult status in Malayalam cinema. It was remade in Kannada as Kal Manja.

Plot
  
A young script writer named Chanthu has a mother who works in a huge mansion owned by her master Thampuran, whose daughter Indira is in love with Chanthu. Eventually, Thampuran finds out about the relationship and forces Chanthu to end it by making him write letters describing his love with an imaginary woman named "Vasumathi" in a fictional "Thottakkattukara" village. However, unknown to everyone, there exists a real Vasumathi in a real Thottakkattukara village, where she is about to commit suicide. Upon receiving the letters, Vasumathi begins to expect a savior by reading between the lines of it, and tells this case to her friend in hopes of getting the details of Chanthu. Through the direction of the letters, Vasumathi awaits for a departing Chanthu on a bus trip to Madras, but not before Chanthu reveals the truth behind the letters to his old school friend Pappan.

At the bus station, Vasumathi explains the whole story to a choreographer named Krishnan and several others just before Chanthu arrives. During the journey, Vasumathi tries to impress Chanthu, but he doesn't realize who she really is. During the halt for dinner in a restaurant, Krishnan asks Chanthu about his journey, to which Chanthu explained the truth about his journey and tells Krishnan that even if the real Vasumathi were to turn up, he would not accept her because of his relationship with Indira. Hearing the story, Krishnan empathizes for Vasumathi by taking her and Chanthu with him to his shooting spot the next day, where his film crew are doing a shoot.

Krishnan introduces Chanthu before the crew's director, who allows Chanthu to unfurl his new script. Chanthu opens his own tale to the director and adds that Vasumathi comes out of the home believing those letters. But the director doesn't accept it, saying that no girl would trust such letters and flee from home like he said. Seeing the dilemma that Chanthu is facing, Vasumathi hinders him and reveals her own origins: she was born in a rich family and was the sole heir of the massive wealth passed down by her mother and grandparents. However, tragedy struck when Vasumathi's mother Ambika died falling into a well and Vasumathi's grandmother died in her sleep, and the fingers point out to Vasumathi as she was present during the incidents. That, along with her refusal to marry her greedy brother-in-law Aravindan, is what led Vasumathi to be tortured by a Hindu priest who practices false wizardry. The tortures inflicted on Vasumathi, along with her supposed guilt over her mother and grandmother's deaths, is what almost drove her to commit suicide until she received Chanthu's letters. Unknown to Vasumathi and the others, it turns out that her relatives (including Aravindan) from her father's family, led by her evil uncle Ramu, were jealous of her inheriting the wealth and plotted to have her murdered to take the wealth for themselves. It also turns out that Ramu was the one who murdered Ambika and Vasumathi's grandmother and framed Vasumathi for them, and that he and the relatives hired the priest to torture Vasumathi into committing suicide in exchange for a portion of the fortune. Vasumathi's grandfather is the only person in the family who sympathizes with Vasumathi's plight, but just like her, he too is unaware of the true circumstances as Ramu and the relatives easily manipulated him into believing that Vasumathi is being possessed by demons and that the tortures are justifiable.

When Vasumathi finishes her story, Krishnan tells the director that it was her own life story and they decide to make them join. The entire crew of the shooting place come together and enjoy that day with music and dance. Chanthu commences to nurture a stardust towards Vasumathi, who truly believes that Chanthu soon realize the veracity and they join. When Vasumathi brings in herself to show the letters to him, Indira arrives at the palace, having been informed by Pappan about what Thampuran did. But Chanthu holds his nerves and introduces Vasumathi as his lover. When Indira delves into Vasumathi, she denies it. A couple of days later, Aravindan reaches the cottage in search of Vasumathi to lure her back to Thottakkattukara (per Ramu's orders). In the absence of Krishnan, Vasumathi is compelled to go with Aravindan. When Krishnan returns home, he reveals the truth to Chanthu by showing him and Indira the letters which were left by Vasumathi, and that the film crew were arrested by the police regarding to Vasumathi's disappearance. Realizing that he was duped to leave Vasumathi at the hands of her merciless uncle and relatives, Chanthu tries to save her, but Aravindan manhandles and sends him back to Madras in disgrace. Around the same time, the film crew returned after enduring the torture from the police and blamed Chanthu for what happened.

Deciding to rectify his mistakes, Chanthu rewrites the script in order to save Vasumathi. As such, he and the film crew reach the home where Ramu and the relatives reside and begin the play using artificially-created horrific visual effects. They eventually locate the palace where Vasumathi is held captive. Upon reaching the palace and tending to Vasumathi, the crew simulated a drama of ghastliness and trepidation, using cinematic ghost characters and audio-visual sequence of events. Vasumathi, Chanthu and the film crew scared the arriving Ramu and his relatives, who called in the same priest to torture Vasumathi again. However, Vasumathi burns the priest's beard and lures him into the palace, where she, Chanthu and the film crew terrify him with their antics, driving him to leave and call off the deal with Ramu. Around the same time, a remorseful Thampuran arrives to the palace to make amends with Chanthu and Indira while learning that Vasumathi actually exists.

Eventually, Ramu and the relatives soon learn that the entire event was all staged to stop them from murdering Vasumathi for the family fortune. Ramu furiously orders the relatives and their thugs to murder Chanthu and the film crew while he confronts Vasumathi near the well where Ambika died. While Chanthu and the film crew were able to fight back against the relatives and the thugs, Ramu admitted to having murdered Ambika and Vasumathi's grandmother just as he intends to stab Vasumathi with a sword. However, Vasumathi's grandfather came to the rescue by fatally stabbing Ramu in the chest with another sword, having overheard everything what Ramu said. Vasumathi reconciles with her grandfather while Ramu dies succumbing to his wounds.

With the plot to murder Vasumathi and her family finally exposed, the relatives and their thugs are arrested for their crimes, but Vasumathi's grandfather too ends up being arrested for killing Ramu. However, the grandfather gratefully entrusts Chanthu and the film crew to take care of Vasumathi before he accepts his arrest. Vasumathi counsels Chanthu to go back to Indira if he chooses to. The film crew later made a movie based on the events, and it is revealed that Chanthu (now a successful script writer) has married Vasumathi while Indira is married to Krishnan.

Cast

 Jayasurya as Chandu, an aspiring screenwriter and the main protagonist of the film
 Navya Nair as Vasumathi, a traditional girl who believed Chandu's letters
 Nair also portrayed Ambika, Vasumathi's mother 
 Bhavana as Indira
 Vineeth as Krishnan a.k.a. Kichu, an assistant choreographer
 Lal as Harikrishnan, the film director
 Salim Kumar as Dance Master Vikram a.k.a. Michael alias Jackson alias Vikram alias, an overrated choreographer
 Vinayakan as Romeo, a junior artist in the film industry
 Cochin Haneefa as Karim, the cameraman
 Siddique as Ramu, Vasumathi's murderous uncle, and the main antagonist of the film
 Janardhanan as Thampuran, Indira's father
 Kulappulli Leela as Chandu's mother
 Krishnakumar as Aravindan
 Madhu as Vasumathi's grandfather
 Indrans as Pappan, Chandu's closest friend
 Jagathy Sreekumar as Manthravad
 T. P. Madhavan as Sathyan, one of Vasumathi's other uncles
 Machan Varghese as Salim, Assistant director
 Kochu Preman as Balan, Palace secretary
 Narayanankutty as Bharathan, bus conductor 
 Ramu as Jagannathan, one of Vasumathi's other uncles
 Mafia Sasi as stunt master
 Captain Raju as Kunjachan, film producer
 Bindu Ramakrishnan as Vasumathi's grandmother
 Ponnamma Babu
 Manka Mahesh
 Poornima Anand 
 Deepika Mohan
 Beena Sabu
 Maya Viswanath
 Nandana as Vandana, a Background dancer
 Bindu Panicker as Reshmi (Cameo Appearance)

Production

Casting 
The initial script by Rafi–Mecartin followed a girl who mistakenly gets a love letter and goes out to find the man who sent her the letter. It was later that the character of Chandu who aspires to be a filmmaker was added in. The title of the film and the name of the protagonist is taken from the 1989 classic Oru Vadakkan Veeragatha, in which the character of Chanthu is known by the sobriquet of Chathiyan Chandu (literally 'Chandu the Betrayer'). The role of Chanthu was first offered to Dileep, who initially accepted the role but later walked out of the project due to unknown reasons. The film was produced and distributed by Lal Creations. The cinematography was done by Saloo George, while editing was done by Harihara Puthran.

Filming 
The first scene of the film was shot in Varikkasseri Mana, a traditional aristocratic Namboothiri family house. According to Mecartin, the location was chosen because of its view and the nature that surrounds the place. The bus stand scene where Vasumathi waits for Chanthu is not a real bus stand and is a set made in the Jawaharlal Nehru Stadium. Despite most of the film taking place in Chennai, most of the scenes were shot in Ernakulam. Only a few scenes were shot in Chennai. The house in which Chandu lives is a old Victorian styled house situated in Ernakulam. Some parts of the song Kakkothikkavile was filmed in front of this Victorian house. The scenes which required the interior of the house was shot in Navodaya Studios. The song Hossaina Hossaina  was also shot in Navodaya Studios. For the climax of the film the directors wanted an old palace. However, they could not get one. But, they managed to rent an abandoned building called Silversand, which used to be a hotel. The climax scenes featured a set that consisted of ghosts and supernatural entities. These ghost costumes were inspired by the fancy dress competitions conducted at the Cochin Carnival.

Soundtrack
The film's soundtrack is composed by Alex Paul. Lyrics are penned by Gireesh Puthenchery and Santhosh Varma.

Reception

Critical response 
Upon release the film received mixed reviews. Sify gave the film a "Disappointing" verdict and wrote: "The director duo of Chathikatha Chanthu seem to have run out of stock as the film leaves the audience confused." IndiaGlitz  gave the film a rating of 2 out on 5 criticizing the screenplay and writing: "On the acting front, Jayasurya is honest and tries manfully in a heavy role. He is good. But alas, that is inadequate to carry off the film. Navya Nair is cute and her performance is also. Vineeth, in a small role, is impressive. The comedy track grates and the music (by Alex Paul) is just about average, Rafi-Mecartin, who has a flair for earthy comedy, is obviously not in their elements. They let the script flounder with some unimaginative handling." However modern reception is more often positive. The film has over the years attained a cult status in Kerala through internet trolls and memes. The character played by Salim Kumar, Dance master Vikram has been subject to many memes over the years.

Box office 
The film was a commercial success at the box office and was declared a super hit at the box office. The film was the fifth highest grossing Malayalam film of the year.

References

External links

2004 films
2000s Malayalam-language films
Indian comedy-drama films
Malayalam films remade in other languages
Films shot at Varikkasseri Mana
Films shot in Ottapalam
Films shot in Kochi
Films shot in Chennai
Films directed by Rafi–Mecartin